Cross-cut, cross cut or cross-cutting may refer to:

Cross-cutting, a film editing technique
Cross-cutting concern, a concept in aspect-oriented software development
Cross-cutting cleavage, a political term
 A cut made by a crosscut saw

See also
 Crosscut (disambiguation)